Three State Finance Commission reports, with recommendations for enhancing the financial health of the local governments were submitted and acted upon in Kerala with practically every recommendation being adopted, as per the provisions of the 73rd and 74th Constitutional Amendments made in 1993. Each State Finance Commission in Kerala has been a path-breaker

First State Finance Commission report
The First State Finance Commission succeeded in integrating seventeen small specific purpose grants into a broader general purpose grants and also in streamlining the determination and transfer of the share of state taxes, making it fully formula-based and non-discretionary.

Its recommendations were:

(1) Expenditure on elections to Local Governments other than District and Block Panchayats may be met by them.

(2) Government may liquidate arrears of share of taxes / grants due to Local Governments in three instalments.

(3) Plinth area may be adopted as the basis for Property Tax.

(4) For arrears of taxes due to Local Governments from different payees penal interest at 2% per month may be charged.

(5) Government may specify only the minimum rate for fees.

(6) Land tax may be doubled.

(7) Formula based devolution of funds may be followed.

(8) Maintenance grant should be based on current cost of construction.

(9) Vehicle tax compensation may be 25% of net collection of motor vehicles tax.

(10) Tax mapping may be followed.

(11) A Fund for local government development may be built up for leveraging funds and for subsidizing the interest rate of non-remunerative but essential schemes.

(12) A statutory authority should give annual reports to the Governor showing the quantum of statutory and non-statutory grants due to local governments and the amount paid.

(13) A special cell may be constituted to watch the implementation of recommendations.

Second State Finance Commission report

The Second State Finance Commission moved away from sharing specific state taxes and suggested global sharing of the state's own tax revenue, fixing 3.5% as general purpose grant and 5.5% as maintenance grant.

Its recommendations were:

(1) 5 % of the own tax revenue of the state may be devolved as a maintenance grant and 3 % as a general purpose grant.
 
(2) Plinth area based property tax may be operationalised without a gap on increase or limit on decrease.

(3) Presumptive profession tax may be introduced to bring certain self-employed occupational groups into the tax limit.

(4) Entertainment Tax may be introduced for cable TV.

(5) Conversion tax may be realized at the rate of 5% of the capital value in the case of conversion of paddy lands.

(6) Service tax may be made compulsory and be linked to the cost of performing obligatory functions and calculated as a percentage of property tax.

(7) Ceiling on surcharges may be removed.
 
(8) Only the minimum may be fixed for non-tax revenue sources.

(9) Local governments should get automatic allocations at the beginning of every month.

(10) A legislative provision may be introduced for indexing non-tax revenue items and taxes like property tax, advertisement tax and service tax linked to the consumer price index for non-manual workers for urban local governments and consumer price index for agricultural labourers for village panchayats.

(11) All local governments should prepare annual maintenance plans.
 
(12) 10% of the development grant may be set apart for an incentive system.

(13) For grants-in-aid a bill system may be introduced for drawing from the treasuries instead of the cheque system.

(14) A cell under the general control of finance and local self-government departments may be set up for monitoring financial matters of Local Governments.

Fourth State Finance Commission Report
The fourth State Finance Commission chaired by Dr M. A. Oommen with S M Vijayanand and Ms Ishita Roy as members, submitted its report on 22 January 2011  as the second Indian State (Bihar submitted in September 2010 as the first) to submit the fourth report, with a recommendation that 25-30 per cent or more of state plan funds need to be devolved to local governments. The general purpose grant had been fixed at 3.5 per cent and the maintenance grant at 4.5 per cent. These components would be enhanced in the coming years. This amounted to a five-fold increase from that recommended by the first State Finance Commission.  The second commission, headed by Prabhat Patnaik, economist, institutionalised devolution of funds and fixed it at 25 per cent.  The third commission upset the entire system. Much more than the commission's recommendations, it was due to the intervention of the Finance Ministry and a reflection on the then United Democratic Front government's stance.

The deplorable condition of rural roads could be attributed to the cut in grants recommended by the third commission.  The Oommen commission had set things in the right course and ratified the recommendations of the third commission by asserting that the allocation should not dip beyond 25 per cent, While launching the People's Plan Campaign, the then government had taken an ad hoc decision to devolve 30 per cent funds to the civic bodies.

The local self-government institutions in the state will get Rs.4,160 crore in 2011-12, a one-third increase from the allocation for 2010-11, following the recommendations of the fourth State Finance Commission. The recommendations had come as a major boost to decentralised governance. While launching the People's Plan Campaign, the then government had taken an ad hoc decision to devolve 30 per cent funds to the civic bodies. This amounted to a five-fold increase from that recommended by the first State Finance Commission.  The second commission, headed by Prabhat Patnaik, economist, institutionalised devolution of funds and fixed it at 25 per cent. The third commission upset the entire system. Much more than the commission's recommendations, it was due to the intervention of the Finance Ministry and a reflection on the then United Democratic Front government's stance.

The fourth State Finance Commission has recommended the government to allocate the special grant worth Rs.12.07 crore to the panchayats from the development fund for 2011-12 depending on their backwardness. Instead of gauging backwardness merely on the basis of SC/ST population in each panchayat, the commission has worked out a deprivation index for providing the special grant to the rural civic bodies which are lagging much behind others in terms of development.

Substantial devolution to local governments prior to State Finance Commissions

Kerala’s decentralisation shows the provision of substantial untied funds for local prioritisation and local resource allocation to identified priority areas. This was not recommended by any State Finance Commission but was a policy decision taken by the State Government at the beginning of the 9th Five Year Plan. While the State has been able to go beyond what is strictly essential (as per SFC reports) and has been able to consolidate Centrally Sponsored schemes in some cases leading to welcome increase in the untied grants recently, there has unfortunately a drop in the statutory grants which is wholly unwelcome.

Also, it has been noticed that restriction of actual flows to PRIs get aggravated every time there is a glitch in the state finances. Thus, even when credited to their Treasury accounts, the panchayats are not able to use the funds because the finance department will not release them. The performance audit shows up some lacunae which have to mostly do with the outmoded accounting and record keeping.

However all this should not detract from the many positive features in Kerala case such as transparency especially in beneficiary selection, RTI, social audit which need to be further encouraged, strengthened and emulated by other states.

See also 
 Local Government Finance in Kerala
 Local governance in Kerala
 Kerala State Finance Commission Reports: SFC I to SFC IV

References 

Local government in Kerala
State agencies of Kerala
Government finances in Kerala